Romnalda ophiopogonoides is a vulnerable species of flowering lily plants endemic to a restricted area of the Wet Tropics of Queensland. In the wild, it has only been found in a few isolated locations in the vicinity of Cooper Creek.

It is a small, hard-leaved lily-like plant that forms in tufts or in clumps, atop stilt-like roots.

References

External links
 Australian Plant Image Index

Lomandroideae
Flora of Queensland
North Queensland
Taxa named by Paul Irwin Forster